Joshua Lamont Bostic (born May 12, 1987) is an American professional basketball player for Anwil Włocławek of the Polish Basketball League.

College career 
Bostic went to the University of Findlay and wrapped up his college career as NABC NCAA Division II National Player of the Year, Division II Bulletin Player of the Year, Midwest Region Player of the Year and Great Lakes Intercollegiate Athletic Conference (GLIAC) Player of the Year. He led the Findlay Oilers to winning the 2009 NCAA Division 2 championship, averaging 18.6 points, 6.2 rebounds, 2.9 assists and 2.4 steals a contest during the 2008–09 season.

Professional career
Bostic went undrafted in the 2009 NBA draft. In August 2009, he signed with Kyoto Hannaryz of Japan for the 2009–10 season.

On November 1, 2010, Bostic was selected by the New Mexico Thunderbirds in the third round of the 2010 NBA D-League Draft.

On August 17, 2011, Bostic signed a one-year deal with Liège Basket of Belgium and earned 2012 Eurobasket.com All-Belgian League 1st Team honors. On June 7, 2012, he signed a two-year deal with Belfius Mons-Hainaut. He left them after one season.

On June 24, 2013, he signed a one-year deal with Élan Chalon of France. On November 11, 2013, he parted ways with Chalon. On November 27, 2013, he signed with Spartak Saint Petersburg of Russia for the rest of the season.

On September 25, 2014, Bostic signed with the Detroit Pistons. However, he was later waived by the Pistons on October 20, 2014. On November 1, 2014, he was acquired by the Grand Rapids Drive as an affiliate player. On January 7, 2015, he was waived by the Drive. The next day, he signed with Spirou Charleroi of the Belgian League for the rest of the season.

On February 3, 2016, he signed with VEF Rīga of Latvia for the rest of the season.

On August 26, 2016, Bostic signed with Juvecaserta Basket of Italy for the 2016–17 season.

On October 18, 2017, Bostic signed with Zadar of Croatia for the rest of the 2017–18 season. He played a great half-season at Zadar during which he was named ABA League MVP of December. On January 29, 2018, he left Zadar and signed with Dinamo Sassari of Italy for the rest of the season.

On August 4, 2020, Bostic returned to Italy and signed a one year deal with Reggio Emilia in the Italian Lega Basket Serie A.

On February 22, 2021, before the end of the season, he transferred to New Basket Brindisi.

On June 8, 2022, he has signed with Anwil Włocławek of the Polish Basketball League.

References

External links
 Eurobasket.com profile
 RealGM.com profile

1987 births
Living people
20th-century African-American people
21st-century African-American sportspeople
African-American basketball players
American expatriate basketball people in Belgium
American expatriate basketball people in Croatia
American expatriate basketball people in France
American expatriate basketball people in Italy
American expatriate basketball people in Japan
American expatriate basketball people in Latvia
American expatriate basketball people in Poland
American expatriate basketball people in Russia
American men's basketball players
Asseco Gdynia players
Basketball players from Ohio
BC Spartak Saint Petersburg players
Belfius Mons-Hainaut players
BK VEF Rīga players
Dinamo Sassari players
Élan Chalon players
Findlay Oilers men's basketball players
Grand Rapids Drive players
Juvecaserta Basket players
KK Włocławek players
KK Zadar players
Kyoto Hannaryz players
Lega Basket Serie A players
Liège Basket players
New Mexico Thunderbirds players
Small forwards
Spirou Charleroi players